The 5th Avenue Theatre is a landmark theatre located in Seattle's Skinner Building, in the U.S. state of Washington. It has hosted a variety of theatre productions and motion pictures since it opened in 1926. The building and land are owned by the University of Washington and were once part of the original campus. The theatre operates as a venue for nationally touring Broadway and original shows by the non-profit 5th Avenue Theatre Association.

The 2,130-seat theatre is the resident home to the 5th Avenue Musical Theatre Company, and employs over 600 actors, musicians, directors, choreographers, designers, technicians, stage hands, box office staff, and administrators, making it the largest theatre employer in the Puget Sound region.  A non-profit, the theatre company is supported by individual and corporate donations, government sources, and box office ticket sales.

The 5th's subscriber season programming includes six to seven shows per year, a mix of locally produced revivals of musical theatre classics, and premieres of bound-for-Broadway shows, and national touring musicals. The 5th Avenue Theatre has established a tradition of being a "testing ground" for new musicals before they make their debut on Broadway, launching hits such as Jekyll & Hyde, Hairspray, and The Wedding Singer. The theatre also hosts a variety of special events, and offers education and outreach programs to school-age children and adults reaching over 61,000 students, professional performers, and audiences each year.

Architecture

Located in the Skinner Building, a historic office block ranging from five to eight stories with retail shops on the ground level, the theatre is surrounded on three sides, with its entry facing its namesake avenue. In addition to an auditorium with an original seating capacity of 3,000, the theatre contains a grand entry hall, and a mezzanine that once featured a tea room in addition to a waiting room and women's lounge.

Robert C. Reamer's design for the 5th Avenue Theatre was modeled to reproduce some of the features of historic and well-known Beijing landmarks. The Norwegian artist Gustav Liljestrom executed the design based on his visit to China, and on Chinesische Architecktur, published in 1925, an illustrated account of German architect Ernst Boerschmann's travels in China.

The ornate historical Chinese style of the theatre distinguishes itself from the Neo-Renaissance exterior of the Skinner Building. Only at the street entry under the marquee does the viewer get a preview of the interior design. Here, adorning the ceiling are plaster representations of wood brackets, beams, and carved reliefs painted in a polychromatic scheme and decorated with stenciled dragons and flower patterns. Carved cloud shapes screen light fixtures to create an indirect lighting effect as the viewer approaches the wooden, brass knobbed entry doors. The original central free-standing box office was replaced by the current box office located to the side of the entry as part of a 1979 renovation. The original Imperial guardian lions (Ruì Shī), commonly called foo dogs or foo lions, originally located outside the entry were moved inside as part of the 1979 renovation.

The interior architecture of the theatre is an "excellent imitation of Chinese wooden temple construction". The two story rectangular lobby features red, stenciled columns wrapped in plaster rising to a timbered roof structure of decoratively painted beams supporting a canopy of bamboo, also imitated in plaster. The original pair of guardian lions, both male, guard the stairway to a second level gallery that serves the theatre balcony. In addition to the Imperial guard lions, other original furnishings, light fixtures, and decoration remain intact.

The decorative details continue in the 2,130-seat auditorium, but the highlight and focal decorative feature is the octagonal caisson from which a sculpted five-toed Imperial Chinese dragon springs. A large chandelier of glass hangs from the dragon's mouth, in reference to the Chinese symbol of a dragon disgorging flaming pearls. One claim puts the size of this caisson at twice the size of the model on which it was based in the throne room of the Hall of Supreme Harmony in the Forbidden City. The opening night program spoke effusively of it:

The dragon motif is repeated in the radial coffers of the caisson and the timbered coffers throughout the theatre. The Imperial dragon is accompanied by the symbol of the Empress, the Chinese phoenix (Fèng huáng), sometimes called Ho-Ho or Ho-Oh Bird from the Japanese. This personal symbol of the Empress is also repeated throughout the theatre, but most prominently in relief as part of the grills above false balconies that once screened organ pipes. In addition to these symbols, orange blossoms, chrysanthemums, and lotus flowers appear throughout the theatre. The highly decorated proscenium arch and safety curtain maintain the Chinese design influence.

Beyond the decorative features of the building, the 5th Avenue Theatre also contained notable technical features when originally built. An ascending orchestra pit and independent Wurlitzer organ platform allowed the musicians to be raised up to main stage height or to orchestra pit level from the basement below. The ventilation system had thermostatic controls throughout the building, and allowed the air to be 'washed' prior to its introduction into the venue at outlets under every third seat.

Significance
Preceding Grauman's Chinese Theater in Hollywood, the 5th Avenue Theatre "has been called the largest and most authentic example of traditional Chinese timber architecture and decoration outside of Asia." In addition, its association with architect Robert Reamer, whose other notable works include the nationally known Old Faithful Inn in Yellowstone National Park, as well as many important buildings in the Art Deco style add to its significance. The Skinner Building was added to the National Register of Historic Places on November 28, 1978.

History

Planning and construction
The president and general manager of Pacific Northwest Theatres, Inc., Harry C. Arthur, believed Seattle to be a place of growing importance in the motion picture industry in the mid-1920s, and consequently as the place to invest for the long term. Arthur's company absorbed a competing chain of 40 theatres by 1926, and sought further expansion. A large holder of the theatre company's stock and debt was C. D. Stimson who sat on the board of directors of both Pacific Northwest Theatres and the Metropolitan Building Company, developer of what became known as the Metropolitan Tract. Stimson promoted the establishment of a theatre district like that which had developed around a theatre he had built in Los Angeles, California. The planned Skinner Building with a theatre owned by Arthur's company would complete the Stimson development of the Metropolitan Tract.

The architect, Robert Reamer, had joined the Metropolitan Building Company after World War I and as their house architect designed the building, inside and out. In creating the 5th Avenue Theatre, Reamer was joined by his colleague, Joseph Skoog, of Reamer's office and Gustav Liljestrom, of the S. & G. Gump Company of San Francisco.

Construction began in October 1925 with construction taking 11 months and costing $1.5 million.

Grand opening
The theatre celebrated its grand opening on September 24, 1926, with an opening unit program that included both film and live vaudeville performances. The opening program included the silent film Young April, Fanchon and Marco's stage presentation The Night Club, and Lipschultz and his Syncopated Soloists. Oliver Wallace, a popular local musician and composer, returned from Portland, Oregon, to be the accompanying organist for opening night. Wallace had been the first theatre organist in a Seattle motion picture house.

Opening night was also marked by festivities outside the theatre. Seven blocks of downtown Seattle around the theatre were closed to street car and automobile traffic. Lured by free street car, bus, and taxicab rides, thousands of people packed Fifth Avenue between Seneca Street and Pike Street, University and Union Streets. The Seattle Times reported:

In the street outside the building a street carnival took place. Living up to the moniker for the theater's marquee, "the Magic Sign of a Wonderful Time," spotlights scanned the night sky, banks of Klieg lights illuminated the streets outside the theater, and flares were shot from the roofs of nearby buildings. Additionally, dance bands were placed at the closed intersections to provide entertainment and, using giant screens to project the words, a sing-along was orchestrated on Fifth Avenue in front of the theatre. An estimated crowd of between 50,000 and 100,000 people participated in the events.

Decline and restoration
Following the grand opening, the theatre served as a venue for vaudeville and film, and following the decline of vaudeville as a movie palace until the 1970s. With the economic recession, the advent of television, and movie complex development in the suburbs, crowds dwindled and the theatre struggled to stay open. It was forced to close its doors in 1978 along with the nearby Orpheum theatre. A variety of re-use possibilities were proposed for the theatre including a Chinese restaurant, a triplex movie theater, an office building, or a shopping center. The city of Seattle was unable to protect the theatre as a designated landmark because of its unique position on the site of the original territorial university grounds owned by the state of Washington.

In 1979, 43 business leaders formed the non-profit 5th Avenue Theatre Association and underwrote a US$2.6 million loan to save the theatre. Among these was Ned Skinner of the shipbuilding family who was an active patron of the theatre. Architect Richard McCann oversaw the restoration efforts.

Several changes were made during the renovation. The vertical marquee which had marked the theatre's presence from 1926 to 1980, was removed, the orchestra pit and auditorium seating were rebuilt, the dressing rooms moved, and the technical systems updated. However, the furniture, fixtures and interior signage were retained. Even the paint was carefully restored to its original luster. The renovation made it suitable again for live performances and filled Seattle's need for a touring Broadway musical venue. Renovation work was completed without federal, state, or local funds.

June 16, 1980, marked the theater's rebirth and a new chapter in Seattle's arts community. At the Grand Opening Gala for the renovated theatre, actress Helen Hayes christened the stage with a kiss and declared the 5th "a national treasure." Beginning on July 3 the 5th presented Annie, the first touring Broadway musical to appear at the theatre. The sold-out show ran for 10 weeks with a total of 77 performances.

The 5th Avenue Theatre continues to thrive with the assistance of many generous donors and volunteers.

Post-1980 history
Since the renovation, the 5th Avenue Theatre has become one of Seattle's most established theatres. In 1989, The 5th Avenue Musical Theatre Company was established as the resident non-profit theatre company.

On February 28, 2001, the Nisqually earthquake rocked the 5th Avenue Theatre. At the time, actors were on stage rehearsing the musical 1776. The theatre suffered minimal damages with no structural damage from the quake. Earthquake repairs included removal and replacement of 72 plaster ceiling supports and the repair of numerous cracks and damaged decorative plaster pieces in the ceiling. Contractors had to install scaffolding tall enough to reach the highest interior crevice in the ceiling eight stories up—the first time that area had been reached in 75 years. The chandeliers had to be lowered for repair and maintenance. As part of the repair work, Turner Construction provided services for seismic upgrades to the Skinner Building.

In November 2009 a new vertical marquee, similar to the sign that was removed as part of the 1980 renovation, was installed.  The marquee was made possible through a donation from Christabel Gough, daughter of Broadway producer and early 5th Avenue promoter Roger L. Stevens. The new sign features a design inspired by both earlier marquees and the theatre's interior, uses LED lights for energy conservation, and includes a revolving "5th" sign at the marquee's top.

The 5th Avenue Musical Theatre Company

Genesis
From the renovation in 1980 until 1985 the non-profit 5th Avenue Theatre successfully operated as a venue for touring Broadway shows. As the United States went through an economic downturn from 1985 to 1989 there was a shortage of touring shows for venues like the 5th. Consequently, many of the country's Broadway houses went unused for extended periods of time. However, the 5th remained open during these years with a reduced staff and was used for community events and local promoters.

This situation forced the theatre to move beyond merely being a presenter of touring musicals. In 1989, the non-profit 5th Avenue Theatre established a resident theatre company, dubbed The 5th Avenue Musical Theatre Company, to produce musicals locally. Since the theatre company's establishment, the 5th's yearly subscriber season programming has included 6 to 7 shows: national touring musicals, locally produced revivals of musical theatre classics, and premieres of bound-for-Broadway shows. With 150 musical theater performances each fall-to-spring subscriber season which attract over 30,000 subscribers and average ticket sales of 300,000 tickets annually, the 5th ranks among the nation's largest musical theater companies.

The musical company employs over 600 actors, musicians, directors, choreographers, designers, technicians, stage hands, box office staff, and administrators, making the 5th the largest theatre employer in the Puget Sound region.  A non-profit, the theatre company is supported by individual and corporate donations, government sources, and box office ticket sales.

TUTS partnership
Frank M. Young was the first executive director of the 5th Avenue Musical Theatre Company. From 1989 to 1999 a collaborative partnership existed between the 5th and Houston's Theatre Under the Stars (TUTS) where Young also served as executive director. This partnership produced 10 seasons of musical theater, including both national tours and self-produced musicals. On October 17, 1989, the first 5th Avenue/TUTS self-produced musical was presented: Mame, starring Juliet Prowse. In 1995, after premiering at the 5th, Jekyll & Hyde became the first 5th Avenue Theatre production to open on Broadway in April 1997. The show was produced in cooperation with Houston's Alley Theatre and TUTS.

In August 2000 the 5th's partnership with TUTS ended as David Armstrong joined the 5th Avenue Musical Theatre Company becoming its first resident Producing Artistic Director launching a new era of collaboration with leading musical theater companies and producers across the country.

Broadway "testing ground"
Since the creation of the 5th Avenue Musical Theatre Company in 1989, the 5th has established a tradition of being a "testing ground" for new musicals before they make their debut on Broadway. Since 2001, the 5th has premiered 17 new works, nine of which have subsequently opened on Broadway.

Some notable musicals shown to Seattle audiences at the 5th Avenue Theatre prior to their success on Broadway include: Jekyll & Hyde in 1995 which was nominated for 4 Tony Awards, Hairspray in 2002 which won 8 Tony Awards, and The Wedding Singer in 2006 which had 4 Tony Award nominations. The film adaptation of Hairspray premiered at the 5th on July 16, 2007 (4 days prior to its nationwide release) as an acknowledgement of the 5th's role in the musical's success on Broadway. The "testing ground" tradition continued in the 2008–2009 season with the pre-Broadway world premieres of Shrek the Musical, and Memphis. Both went on to win Tony awards, Shrek winning one in 2009 and Memphis winning four, including Best Musical, in 2010. In the 2009–2010 season, they premiered Catch Me If You Can, which premiered on Broadway in the spring of 2011. In their 2010–2011 season, they premiered A Christmas Story: The Musical, based on the film of the same name, and more recently the premiere of Aladdin, based on the Disney film "Aladdin". In the 2011–2012 season, First Date premiered as a co-production with ACT starring Eric Ankrim before heading to Broadway to star Zachary Levi and Krysta Rodriguez.

Along with their successful pre-Broadway tryouts, the 5th Avenue Theatre has also performed two musicals, Princesses in 2005 and Lone Star Love in 2007, which were originally scheduled to go to Broadway, but did not due to poor reviews. They also announced the premiere of a musical adaptation of Cry-Baby, in 2007, but it was later replaced with Buddy: The Buddy Holly Story.

Community outreach programs
The theatre also hosts a variety of special events, and offers a number of education and outreach programs to school-age children and adults reaching over 61,000 students, professional performers, and audiences each year. One example of this is the 5th Avenue High School Musical Theatre Awards which evaluate and honor the performances of student actors and stage hands in Washington state high school productions. At the end of each school year, a Tony Awards-style ceremony is held which includes high-profile presenters, performances by nominees, and acceptance speeches by the award recipients. The awards ceremony has become a useful scouting event for colleges looking to recruit talent for their drama departments.

Productions by season

2022–2023 season 

 The Griswolds' Broadway Vacation (Sep 10 – Oct 2, 2022)
 Choir Boy (Sep 11 – Oct 23, 2022), co-production with ACT Theatre
 The Wiz (Nov 20 – Dec 23, 2022)
 Into the Woods (Feb 10 – Mar 5, 2023)
 Sweeney Todd (Apr 21 – May 14, 2023)
 Les Misérables (May 24 – Jun 17, 2023)

2021–2022 season 
 Beauty and the Beast (Jan 12 – Feb 6, 2022)
 Afterwords (Apr 29 – May 21, 2022)
 And So That Happened... (May 17 – Jun 26, 2022), co-production with ACT Theatre
 The Prom (May 31 – Jun 19, 2022)
 Come from Away (Jul 20 – Aug 7, 2022)

2019–2020 season 
 Austen's Pride (Oct 4–27, 2019)
 Mrs. Doubtfire (Nov 26 – Dec 29, 2019)
 Bliss (Jan 31 – Feb 23, 2020)

Sister Act, Jersey Boys, Once on This Island, and Evita were planned for the season, but were canceled due to the COVID-19 pandemic. The 5th Avenue Theatre also planned to include Evita, Broadway Vacation, The Musical, Shrek The Musical, Godspell, Chilifinger! The Musical, and Come from Away in its 2020–2021 season, but all live performances were canceled until 2022.

2018–2019 season 
 Come from Away (Oct 9 – Nov 4, 2018)
 Annie (Nov 23 – Dec 30, 2018)
 Rock of Ages (Feb 1–24, 2019)
 Marie, Dancing Still (Mar 22 – Apr 14, 2019)
 Urinetown (Apr 6 – May 26, 2018), co-production with ACT Theatre
 The Lightning Thief (Apr 23–28, 2019)
 West Side Story (May 31 – Jun 23, 2019), co-production with Spectrum Dance Theater

2017–2018 season 
 Something Rotten! (Sep 12 – Oct 1, 2017)
 Ragtime (Oct 13 – Nov 5, 2017)
 Irving Berlin's Holiday Inn (Nov 24 – Dec 31, 2017)
 Mamma Mia! (Feb 2–25, 2018)
 Ride the Cyclone (Mar 10 – May 20, 2018), co-production with ACT Theatre
 Kiss Me, Kate (Apr 6–29, 2018), produced as part of the Seattle Celebrates Shakespeare citywide festival
 The Hunchback of Notre Dame (Jun 1–24, 2018)

Previous seasons

See also
 Fox Theater (Spokane, Washington)

References

Further reading
 Boerschmann, Ernst. (1925). Chinesische Architektur, Berlin: E. Wasmuth, AG. 
 Kreisman, Lawrence. (1992). The Stimson Legacy: Architecture in the Urban West, Seattle: Willows Press/University of Washington Press. 
 Breeze, Carla. (2003). American Art Deco: Modernistic Architecture and Regionalism, New York: W.W. Norton & Company.

External links

 5th Avenue Theatre website

Buildings and structures in Seattle
Culture of Seattle
Downtown Seattle
National Register of Historic Places in Seattle
Robert Reamer buildings
Theatres on the National Register of Historic Places in Washington (state)
Tourist attractions in Seattle